The Clayton family is an old Quaker family that came to America with William Penn in 1682 and has been prominent politically, particularly in Pennsylvania and Delaware.

In 1682 William Penn sailed for America with a large fleet of ships carrying immigrants. Perhaps most of these people were Quakers, but many were not. William Penn himself landed at New Castle, but at least one of his fleet made its way into Chesapeake Bay: the Submission, out of Liverpool and Bristol. The Submission arrived at Choptank, on the Choptank River in Dorchester County on the Eastern Shore of Maryland in November 1682. The "ship's log" lists her passengers, among them James and Jane Clayton and their six children. They were from Middlewich, in the Cheshire County, England.

Many or most of the passengers of the Submission disembarked at Choptank and traveled overland to Bucks County, Pennsylvania, on the west side of the Delaware River a few miles above Philadelphia. It may be assumed that James Clayton and his family were in this number. Neither is it difficult to imagine that some of the party found desirable home sites along the way. Each of the three Clayton sons of James Clayton, as he reached his majority, appeared in the records of Kent County, Delaware.

The listing below is not a genealogy of the family, and is missing many branches of a very large posterity. It is rather intended to an index, providing a guide for the relationships among the many members who are notable and are mentioned in other articles. Presently it is focused on the family in the state of Delaware. As with many family histories, attempts have been made to trace the lineage in the past based on incomplete or inaccurate information, and so therefore, older sources may have information inconsistent with later research.

Family members
James Clayton (1632–1684), m. Jane, to America with Penn’s fleet, 1682

James (1666–1697), m. Mary Bedwell Webb, res. Kent County, DE
John (c1692- 1759)
John Clayton
John Edmund Clayton
James Clayton (c1720- ), m. Grace, miller near Wyoming, Delaware
Dr. Joshua Clayton (1744–1798), m. Rachel McCleary
James Lawson Clayton 1769-1833), m. Elizabeth Polk
Richard Clayton (1774–1836), m. Mary Richardson, Sarah Lawrenson & Araminta Lewis
Thomas Clayton (1777–1854), m. Jennette Macomb
John Clayton (1749–1802), Judge, m. Mary Manson Manlove
James Clayton, m. Sarah Medford
Edward Clayton, m. Rachel H. Manlove
Thomas Clayton, m. Elizabeth Wharton
Charles Clayton
John Clayton
Lydia Clayton, m. Joseph Hanson
James Hanson
Grace Clayton
Miriam Clayton
Amelia Clayton
James (George) Clayton (1761–1820), m. Sarah Middleton
Lydia Clayton, m. John Kellum
John M. Clayton (1796–1856), m. Sallie Ann Fisher
James Clayton (1823–1851)
Charles McClyment Clayton (1825–1849)
Harriet M. Clayton, m. Walter Douglass & Harry W. Peterson
John Clayton Douglass (1817–1875), m. Ellen
Clayton Douglass (died at 18)
Constance Margaret Douglass (1852–1926), m. Francis Nixon Buck (1842–1926)
Clayton Douglass Buck (1890–1965), m. Alice du Pont (Wilson) (1891–1967)
Clayton Douglass Buck Jnr. ( -1986), m. Mary Biddle Sinclair ( -2009)
Elizabeth Clayton, unmarried
Mary Anne Clayton, m. George T. Fisher
James Clayton Fisher
John Clayton Fisher
James H. M. Clayton, unmarried
James (1695–1761) to North Carolina 1738
Sarah (1668- )
John (1671-c1718 ), m. Mary Smith & Mary Wilson
Mary (1)
Joshua (1)
Susanna, m. Abraham Vanhoy
Hannah, m. John Levick, & Henry Stevens
Elizabeth, m. Mark Manlove, Jr)
Daniel
Jonathan
John
Mary (1674- )
Joshua (1677-c1760), m. Mary & Sarah
Sarah, m. Thomas Cowgills
Lydia, m. John Cowgills
Lewis
Jordan
Lydia (c1677- )

John Clayton
Joe Clayton
Francesca Clayton

Notes

References

External links
The Clayton Family of Middlewich 
History of Delaware 1609-1888

Places with more information
Delaware Historical Society  505 Market St., Wilmington, Delaware (302) 655-7161
University of Delaware Library  181 South College Ave., Newark, Delaware (302) 831-2965

Families from Delaware
American families of English ancestry
Political families of the United States